Hunston is a village and civil parish in the Chichester district of West Sussex, England. It lies on the B2145 Road two miles (3.2 km) south of Chichester.

History
Hunston was listed in the Domesday Book of 1086 in the Hundred of Stockbridge as having 24 households, one mill, one pound and two salthouses, with a value of 4 pounds.

Notable people
James Hodson (1808-1879), first class cricketer who died at Hunston Mill in 1879.

Ellis Brown (1939-1997), professional golfer and chess IM lived in Hunston from 1945 to 1962.

References

External links
 Hunston Parish Council

Villages in West Sussex